is a Japanese football player. He plays for JEF United Chiba.

Career
Issei Takahashi joined J2 League club JEF United Chiba in 2017.

Club statistics
Updated to 7 January 2019.

References

External links
Profile at Renofa Yamaguchi
Profile at JEF United Chiba

1998 births
Living people
Association football people from Aomori Prefecture
Japanese footballers
J2 League players
JEF United Chiba players
Renofa Yamaguchi FC players
Montedio Yamagata players
Association football midfielders